This is a list of the municipalities in the state of Amazonas (AM), located in the North Region of Brazil. Amazonas is divided into 62 municipalities, which are grouped into 13 microregions, which are grouped into 4 mesoregions.

See also
Geography of Brazil
List of cities in Brazil

Amazonas